Temmink: The Ultimate Fight is a Dutch movie from 1998 directed by Boris Paval Conen, starring Jack Wouterse, Jacob Derwig and Will van Kralingen.

Plot summary
Sometime in the near future the main character, the sociopathic Temmink, beats a passerby to death and ends up in the so-called "Arena" - a modern version of the ancient Roman Colosseum. In an acrylic glass cage, criminals with a violent past fight each other for life or death like Roman gladiators, albeit with their bare hands in a cagefight without rules. As Temmink survives fight after fight and thus prolongs his stay in the Arena he undergoes changes. For the first time in his life he is capable of loving and makes friendship. In the background a discussion develops in the media and society in general about the ballot (who fights who) possibly being fixed and about the whole principle of convicted criminals fighting each other to death in front of a crowd.

Themes
Although this movie obviously contains some violent and bloody fighting scenes from the Arena, Temmink also contains more political themes such as freedom and how society handles its criminals.
When released in the Netherlands audiences and critics were not too impressed by the film. Director Boris Paval Conen began a career in television afterwards.

Cast
Jack Wouterse - Temmink 
Jacob Derwig - David
Herman Gilis - The Master
Will van Kralingen - Yvonne Bouhali
Joe Montana - Goliath
Martin Schwab - Saddam

External links

1998 films
1990s Dutch-language films
Dutch action films
1998 action films